The Principality of Albania (Albanian: Principata e Arbërisë) was an Albanian principality ruled by the Albanian dynasty of Thopia. One of the first notable rulers was Tanusio Thopia, who was Count of Mat since 1328. The principality changed hands between the Thopia dynasty and the Balsha dynasty, twice before 1392, when Durrës was annexed by the Republic of Venice.

History
One of the first notable rulers of the Thopia family was Tanusio Thopia; he was mentioned in 1329 as one of the counts of Albania. 
In an act of Robert, King of Naples, dated 15 April 1338, Tanusio was mentioned as Count of Matia (conte di Matia). This reconfirmed Thopia's relations to the Angevins from the time of Philip I. By 1340 the Thopia controlled much of the territory between the rivers Mati and Shkumbin rivers. Together with the Muzaka family, they agreed to recognize Angevin suzerainty after rebelling against the Serbs. However except for Andrea Muzaka who defeated the Serbs in a battle in the Peristeri mountains, no action was taken to realize the treaty with the Angevins.

By 1343, Serbian King Stefan Dušan had conquered almost all of Albania, except for Durazzo which had been defended under the command of Tanusio.

After Stefan Dusan's death in 1355 Thopia family regained its domains and ruled most of central Albania. In 1358, Karlo rose against the rule of the Anjou and could drive them out up to Durrës from Epirus and Albania.  It prevailed from 1358 to 1368 over far parts of central Albania and called themselves Princeps Albaniae.

Since 1362, Karlo sought himself to set Durrës, which was in the possession of the Duchess Johanna of Anjou, also into the possession of the city. The first, certainly still unsuccessful siege lasted from April 1362 until May 1363. Then, Thopia had to withdraw his troops, who were weakened by an epidemic disease. Only in 1367 could Karlo conquer Durrës, who had attained in the meantime the tacit agreement of the Venetians for his project and make important port his residence.

Karlo gained control of Durrës in 1368, which was where the Angevins held out due to their Kingdom becoming smaller in size. This event caused the Kingdom of Albania to end.

Balša II made a fourth attempt to conquer Durrës, an important commercial and strategetic center, which was ruled by rival, Karl Thopia. In 1382, Balša II began a war and seized Durrës. In 1385, the defeated Karl Thopia, appealed to Murad I for support against his rivals, the House of Balšić of the Principality of Zeta. This was the equivalent of inviting the Ottoman Empire into Albania in order to help him defeat his rivals of the Balšić family.

This attempt caused an Ottoman force, led by Hayreddin Pasha, to quickly march into Albania along the Via Egnatia. The Ottoman force routed the Balšas by inflicting heavy defeats on Balša II's forces. Balša II himself was killed in a big battle on Saurian Field near Lushnje (Battle of Savra) in 1385, ending the Balša family's rule over Durrës. In 1392 the Durazzo fell under the Republic of Venice.

After Gjergj's death, Niketa Thopia was the next ruler and also the final. After the death of Bayezid (1402), many Albanian lords recognized Venetian suzerainty, such as Niketa, John Kastrioti and Koja Zaharija. The Venetians were interested in having some buffer zone between them and the advancing Ottoman army.. Niketa continued to be the ruler of Kruje until 1415 when it fell under the Ottoman Empire.

Monarchs

See also
Albanian principalities
History of Albania

References

Sources
 Albanian Academy of Science. History of Albanian People.  
 Stefanaq Pollo Histoire de l'Albanie des origines à nos jours.  Roanne: Horvath. 1974. 
 Tajar Zavalani: Histori e Shqipnis. Tiranë: Phoenix. 1998. 
 Georges Castellan: Histoire de l’Albanie et des Albanais. Crozon: Armeline. 2002. 

1444 disestablishments
States and territories established in 1368
Former countries in the Balkans
Albanian principalities